This is a list of types of limestone arranged according to location. It includes both formal stratigraphic unit names and less formal designations.

Africa

Egypt

Tura limestone, used for the Great Pyramid casing stones
Mokattam limestone; Great Pyramid core stones and head of the Great Sphinx are of the "Member III" stratum
Galala marble (a type of limestone, not a true marble)

Asia

India

Camical grade
Sement grade 
Steel grade

Israel (West Bank)

Europe

Austria

Belgium
, (not a "true marble"; Devonian limestone)

Croatia

France

, or "Paris stone" (city buildings are widely faced with it) 
, or Oise, limestone (variety of Lutetian)

, in the Loire Valley

Germany

Gibraltar

Ireland
 , not a "true marble"; fossiliferous Carboniferous limestone.

Italy
 , not a "true marble"; fossiliferous limestone

United Kingdom
England:
  (not a "true marble"; Carboniferous limestone)
 
 
 , the famous London Stone is made of this.
  (not a "true slate"; thin-bedded limestone)
  (not a "true marble"; stromatolitic limestone)
 
 Dent Marble (not a "true marble"; Crinoidal limestone)
 
 
 
 
 
 
 
 
 
 
 
 
 
  (not a "true marble"; fossiliferous limestone)
  (not a "true marble"; fossiliferous freshwater limestone)
Scotland:
 
Wales:

North America

United States

 (Bedford limestone)

Michigan limestone

 (not a "true marble"; oolitic limestone)

 (not a "true marble"; crystalline limestone)

Canada
 (not a "true marble"; bituminous dolomite)
 (also known as the "Ostracod Limestone")

Oceania

Australia

New Zealand

Generic limestone categories

This section is a list of generic types of limestone

See also

External links
Pivko, D. (2003) Natural stones in Earth’s history. Acta Geologica Universitatis Comenianae. vol. 58, pp. 73–86.

Limestone
Limestone
.Limestone
Limestone
Limestone
Limestone